Ully Sigar Rusady (born 4 January 1952 in Garut, West Java) is an Indonesian musician and environmental activist. She wrote many songs with an environmental theme, performed by singers including Nur Afni Octavia, Anggun C. Sasmi, Ita Purnamasari, Bangkit Sanjaya, SAS, Arthur Kaunang and Sonatha Tanjung.

Early life 

Ully is the sister of Indonesian actress Paramitha Rusady.

In early life, she learned guitar playing from her parents Ayu Marry Zumarya and Raden Mas Yus Rusady Wirahaditenaya in Bandung, West Java. As a teenager, she moved to Makassar, South Sulawesi to follow her father who was in the army. In Makassar, she founded bands Puspa Nita and Shinta Eka Paksi.

In 1975, her family moved back to Jakarta. She learned contemporary music at the Indonesia Music Foundation with Slamet Abdul Sjukur. She demonstrated her capability as a festival participant including the National Festival of Popular Song (1978 and 1981).

Awards 

 Global 500 Award from United Nation.
 United Nations Environment Program (1987).
 International Woman of The Year dari International Biographical Centre of Cambridge England (1993).
 Satya Lencana Pembangunan Medal from Indonesian President (1996).
 Satya Nugraha Medal from Minister of Forestry of the Republic of Indonesia (2000).
 Indonesia Award Award Coordinating Minister for People's Welfare (1997).
 1000 Face of Women Leaders in the Field of Environment Charter from Minister of State for the Role of Women (1999).
 Asean Development Citra Award (1999–2000).
 Bintang Jasa Pratama Award from Indonesian President (2000).
 KALPATARU Award from Environment State Minister (2001).
 25th Achievement in Environment Activities Jakarta Provincial Government
 Tsunami Volunteers from Aceh Provincial Government

Festivals 

 National Festival of Popular Song (1978 and 1981).
 ASEAN Popular Songwriting Festival (1982 and 1983).
 World Music Oriental Festival at Sarajevo, Bosnia-Harzegovina (2005).

Discography 

 Rimba Gelap (producer Irama Mas, 1978).
 Rimba Gelap versi II (Irama Mas/ Virgo Ramayana).
 Pelita dalam Gulita (Jackson Records, 1981).
 Pengakuan (Jackson Records, 1983).
 Senandung Kabut Biru (Billboard, 1986).
 Titian Karier (Jackson/Metrotama).
 Satulah Indonesia with Paramitha Rusady (Blackboard).
 Air Sumber Kehidupan (USR Associates, 2003).

References 

1952 births
Living people
Indonesian musicians